The Kievan Chronicle or Kyivan Chronicle is an Old East Slavic chronicle of Kievan Rus'. It was written around 1200 in Vydubychi monastery as a continuation of the Primary Chronicle. It is known from a single copy in the 15th-century Hypatian Codex, where it is sandwiched between the Primary Chronicle and the Galician–Volhynian Chronicle. It covers the period from 1118, where the Primary Chronicle ends, until 1200, although its final entry is misdated to 1199. A final short notice mentions the start of the reign of Roman the Great as "autocrat of all Russia" in 1201.

Composition 
Among the sources used by the anonymous chronicler were a chronicle of the city of Pereyaslavl, house chronicles of the Rurikid dynasty (specifically of Rurik Rostislavich, Igor and Oleg Svyatoslavich, and Vladimir Glebovich) and a chronicle of Pechersk monastery. There is evidence that a redactor added material from the Galician–Volhynian Chronicle in the 13th century. Because its sources, save for the monastic chronicle, are secular and were probably not written by monks, the Kievan Chronicle is a politico-military history of the disintegration of Kievan Rus'. It contains a historiographical account of the events celebrated in the epic Tale of Igor’s Campaign, in which the basic sequence of events is the same. It also contains a passion narrative of the martyrdom of the prince Igor Olgovich in 1147.

Authorship 
Based on the 1661 Paterik of the Kievan Caves Monastery, 17th-century writers started to assert that Nestor "the Chronicler" wrote many of the surviving Old East Slavic chronicles, including the Primary Chronicle, the Kievan Chronicle and the Galician–Volhynian Chronicle, even though many of the events described therein were situated in the entire 12th and 13th century (long after Nestor's death  1114). From the 1830s to around 1900, there was fierce academic debate about Nestor's authorship, but the question remained unresolved, and belief in Nestorian authorship had persisted.

Contents 
Unlike the Primary Chronicle, in which the Lithuanians were portrayed as a people which had been subdued by Yaroslav the Wise, and paid tributed to Kievan Rus' until at least the early 12th century, the Kievan Chronicle narrates about a 1132 campaign in which a Rus' army burnt down Lithuanian settlements, only to be ambushed by Lithuanians on the way back and taking heavy losses.

The Kievan Chronicle contains references to the fall of Jerusalem in 1187 and the death of the Emperor Frederick Barbarossa on the Third Crusade in 1190, considering the former—and the failure of the crusade—divine punishment for sin and the latter a martyrdom.

Notes

References

Bibliography 
 
  
 
 
 

13th-century history books
East Slavic chronicles
Old Church Slavonic literature
Slavic history